In algebraic geometry, a sheaf of algebras on a ringed space X is a sheaf of commutative rings on X that is also a sheaf of -modules. It is quasi-coherent if it is so as a module.

When X is a scheme, just like a ring, one can take the global Spec of a quasi-coherent sheaf of algebras: this results in the contravariant functor  from the category of quasi-coherent (sheaves of) -algebras on X to the category of schemes that are affine over X (defined below). Moreover, it is an equivalence: the quasi-inverse is given by sending an affine morphism  to

Affine morphism 
A morphism of schemes  is called affine if  has an open affine cover 's such that  are affine. For example, a finite morphism is affine. An affine morphism is quasi-compact and separated; in particular, the direct image of a quasi-coherent sheaf along an affine morphism is quasi-coherent.

The base change of an affine morphism is affine. 

Let  be an affine morphism between schemes and  a locally ringed space together with a map . Then the natural map between the sets:

is bijective.

Examples 
More generally, if F is a coherent sheaf on X, then one still has , usually called the abelian hull of F; see Cone (algebraic geometry)#Examples.

The formation of direct images 
Given a ringed space S, there is the category  of pairs  consisting of a ringed space morphism  and an -module .

The above equivalence can be used (among other things) to do the following construction. As before, given a scheme S, let A be a quasi-coherent -algebra and then take its global Spec: . Then, for each quasi-coherent A-module M, there is a corresponding quasi-coherent -module  such that  called the sheaf associated to M. Put in another way,  determines an equivalence between the category of quasi-coherent -modules and the quasi-coherent -modules.

See also 
quasi-affine morphism
Serre's theorem on affineness

References

External links 
https://ncatlab.org/nlab/show/affine+morphism

Sheaf theory
Morphisms of schemes